The 1972 Cork Intermediate Football Championship was the 37th staging of the Cork Intermediate Football Championship since its establishment by the Cork County Board in 1909. The draw for the opening round fixtures took place on 30 January 1972.

The final was played on 22 October 1972 at the Athletic Grounds in Cork, between Dohenys and Glanworth, in what was their first ever meeting in the final. Dohenys won the match by 4-10 to 1-07 to claim their first ever championship title.

Results

Final

References

Cork Intermediate Football Championship